Mirat-ul-Uroos (Urdu:lit:The Mirror of the Bride) is a Pakistani telenovela inspired from the novel of same name by Nazir Ahmad Dehlvi. It was directed by Anjum Shahzad while written by Umera Ahmad. It aired on Geo Entertainment in Pakistan from 4 December 2012 to 6 June 2013. The story of the serial revolves around the granddaughters of Akbari, played by Aamina Sheikh and Mehwish Hayat, and the grandsons of Asghari, played by Mikaal Zulfiqar and Ahsan Khan who later married.

Plot summaray 
Mirat-ul-Uroos contrasts the lives of the grandchildren of Akbari and Asghari. Akbari's first granddaughter Aiza is arrogant, spendthrift and has been raised with a lot of love, while her second granddaughter Aima is the exact opposite of Aiza. While Asghari's grandsons are Hammad and Hashim, who fall for and eventually marry Aiza and Aima. Aiza shows her true colours in her in-laws' house. Hammad is involved in an extramarital affair and Aiza leaves him, but they eventually reunite.

Cast 
 Mehwish Hayat as Aima
 Aamina Sheikh as Aiza
 Ahsan Khan as Hashim
 Mikaal Zulfiqar as Hammad
 Samina Ahmad as Asghari
 Ayesha Khan as Akbari
 Momal Sheikh as Hamna 
 Umer Naru as Farhan
 Afraz Rasool as Zain
 Sarah Khan as Javeria a.ka. Joey
 Saba Faisal as Rafia; Hammad and Haashim's mother
 Azra Mohyeddin as Amna; Aiza and Aima's mother
 Mohsin Gillani as Wajahat Akbar Choudhary; Hammad and Haashim's father
 Hashim Butt as Naasir Asghar Choudhry; Aiza and Aima's father

Background and development 
The novel Mirat-ul-Uroos was first published in 1869 and was written by Nazir Ahmad Dehlvi. It is considered as the first novel in Urdu literature. The theme of the novel promotes the cause of female education in Muslim and Indian society.

It was the third TV adaptation of Nazir's novel. The producer of the serial Abdullah Kadwani stated that the serial is not an adaptation of Miraat-ul-Uroos rather it is inspired from the novel and the story of the serial starts from where the story of the novel ends. The script was written by famous Pakistani author and screenwriter Umera Ahmad who previously worked with the production house on hit serials such as Doraha (2008) and Meri Zaat Zarra-e-Benishan (2010).

International broadcast 
Mirat-ul-Uroos was also broadcast in India by Zindagi, under the title Aaina Dulhan Ka, premiering on 10 November 2014 and ending its run on 13 December 2014. Due to its popularity in India, it started to run again from 8 May 2015 at 6pm.

References

External links 
 Official website

Urdu-language telenovelas
Pakistani telenovelas
2012 telenovelas
2012 Pakistani television series debuts
2013 Pakistani television series endings
Geo TV original programming
Zee Zindagi original programming